4,4′-Methylenebis(2-chloroaniline) (also known as MOCA, MBOCA, and bisamine) is a substance used as a curing agent in polyurethane production.  MOCA is an aromatic amine which is structurally similar to benzidine, a known human bladder carcinogen. MOCA has been shown to cause hepatomas in mice and rats, lung and mammary carcinomas in rats and bladder cancer in dogs. It is a proven human carcinogen standing on the WHO List of IARC Group 1 carcinogens, with a current threshold limit value of 0.01 ppm in the industrial atmosphere. Animal studies have resulted in tumor growth in the liver, lung, and bladder. 

Employee exposure is often monitored by measurement of urinary MOCA in free and/or conjugated form. The best currently available indicator of absorption of MOCA is urinary total MOCA estimations based on spot creatinine corrected urines. Although this method is not without limitations, that is unmetabolised MOCA is measured and dose-response curves are lacking, its use is a reasonable means of monitoring the effectiveness of engineering controls, personal protective equipment and work practices including education. MOCA levels are usually higher at the end of the shift and reflect exposure over the preceding two to three days. The biological half-life of MOCA in urine is approximately 23 hours. 

It is a weak base with a slight odor and is reactive to active metals such as sodium, potassium, magnesium and zinc.

References

Anilines
Chloroarenes
IARC Group 1 carcinogens